Ancylosis leucocephala is a species of snout moth in the genus Ancylosis. It was described by Staudinger, in 1879. It is found in Russia and Romania.

The wingspan is about 19 mm.

References

Moths described in 1879
leucocephala
Moths of Europe